KKN di Desa Penari is a 2022 Indonesian horror film directed by Awi Suryadi, based on a viral Twitter thread of the same name (later rewritten as a novel) by SimpleMan, produced by MD Pictures and Pichouse Films. This film stars Tissa Biani, Adinda Thomas, and Achmad Megantara. This film released on April 30, 2022, previously this film was planned to be released on March 19, 2020, and February 24, 2022, but both canceled due to the COVID-19 pandemic. Upon its release, it became the highest-grossing film in Indonesian history.

Plot 
Nur (Tissa Biani), Widya (Adinda Thomas), Ayu (Aghniny Haque), Bima (Achmad Megantara), Anton (Calvin Jeremy), and Wahyu (Fajar Nugraha) will carry out KKN (Student study service) in a remote village.They never think that the village they chose turns out to be extraordinary. Mr. Prabu (Kiki Narendra) the village head, warns them not to cross the prohibited gate. The mysterious place might have something to do with the beautiful dancer who starts to disturb Nur and also Widya. One by one began to feel the strangeness of the village. Bima begins to change his attitude. Their KKN is a mess. It seems that the invisible inhabitants of the village do not like them. Nur finally discovers that one of them violates a fatal rule in the village. The terror of the mysterious dancer is even more sinister. They ask for help from Mbah Buyut (Diding Boneng), a local shaman. Too late. They are threatened not to be able to return safely from the village known as the Dancer's Village.

Cast 
 Tissa Biani as Nur
 Adinda Thomas as Widya
 Achmad Megantara as Bima
 Aghniny Haque as Ayu
 Calvin Jeremy as Anton
 Fajar Nugraha as Wahyu
 Kiki Narendra as Prabu
 Aulia Sarah as Badarawuhi
 Aty Cancer as Bu Sundari
 Diding Boneng as Mbah Buyut
 Dewi Sri as Mbah Dok
 Andri Mashadi as Ilham
 Irfani Zhang as Dancer Village
 Lydia Kandou as Widya's mother (extended version only)

Reception 
This film broke the record as the highest-grossing Indonesian film of all time, with the number of tickets selling at least 9.233.847 viewers as of September 8, 2022. It replaced the position of Warkop DKI Reborn: Jangkrik Boss! Part 1 by Anggy Umbara which held the record for the highest-grossing Indonesian film of all time for almost six years.

See also 

 KKN (Student study service)
 KKN di Desa Penari (novel)

References

External links 
 

2022 horror films
Indonesian horror films
Films set in Java
Films directed by Awi Suryadi
Films postponed due to the COVID-19 pandemic
2020s Indonesian-language films
Javanese-language films
2022 multilingual films
Indonesian multilingual films